The Men's 100 metre breaststroke SB4 event at the 2016 Paralympic Games took place on 11 September 2016, at the Olympic Aquatics Stadium. No heats were held. The swimmers with the eight fastest times advanced to the final.

Final 
19:56 11 September 2016:

Notes

Swimming at the 2016 Summer Paralympics